Amusia is a musical disorder that includes defects in pitch detection, musical memory and recognition.

Amusia may also refer to:

 Amusia (album), a 2001 album by Katastrophy Wife
 Amusia (spider), a genus of spiders
 Amusia, a 2010 collaborative album by Danish musician Jasper Høiby
 Amusia, a 1994 album by American musician Elliott Sharp
 "Amusia", a song from the 2013 Asymmetry (Karnivool album)
 "Amusia", an episode of Mozart in the Jungle, a TV series from Amazon